The Machine Age may refer to:

 The Machine Age (film), a 1977 Canadian short television film
 The Machine Age (EP), a 2003 EP by Chemlab

See also
 Machine Age, an era that includes the early-to-mid 20th century